The ferruginous pygmy owl (Glaucidium brasilianum) is a small owl that breeds in south-central Arizona and southern Texas in the United States, south through Mexico and Central America, to South America into Brazil, Bolivia, Paraguay and Argentina.

In Central America and South America, it is the most widely distributed pygmy owl and is probably one of the most numerous owl species in those areas. It is found in a wide range of semi-open wooded habitats.

Taxonomy
The ferruginous pygmy owl was formally described in 1788 by the German naturalist Johann Friedrich Gmelin in his revised and expanded edition of Carl Linnaeus's Systema Naturae. He placed it with all the other owls in the genus Strix and coined the binomial name Strix brasiliana. Although not cited directly, Gmelin's description was ultimately based on the "Cabure" that had been described in 1648 by the German naturalist Georg Marcgrave in his Historia Naturalis Brasiliae. The ferruginous pygmy owl is now placed with 28 other small owls in the genus Glaucidium that was introduced in 1826 by the German zoologist Friedrich Boie. The genus name is from Ancient Greek glaukidion meaning "little owl" or "owlet". It is diminutive of glaux meaning "owl".

Thirteen subspecies are recognised:
 G. b. cactorum Van Rossem, 1937 – south Arizona (USA) to Sonora to north Nayarit (west Mexico)
 G. b. intermedium Phillips, AR, 1966 – south Nayarit to Oaxaca (west Mexico)
 G. b. ridgwayi Sharpe, 1875 – south Texas (central south USA) to west Panama
 G. b. medianum Todd, 1916 – north Colombia
 G. b. margaritae Phelps, WH & Phelps, WH Jr, 1951 – Margarita Island (off Venezuela)
 G. b. phaloenoides (Daudin, 1800) – north, east Venezuela, Trinidad and the Guianas
 G. b. duidae Chapman, 1929 – Cerro Duida (south Venezuela)
 G. b. olivaceum Chapman, 1939 – Auyán Tepui (southeast Venezuela)
 G. b. ucayalae Chapman, 1929 – Amazonia
 G. b. brasilianum (Gmelin, JF, 1788) – east Brazil to northeast Argentina
 G. b. pallens Brodkorb, 1938 – east Bolivia, west Paraguay and north Argentina
 G. b. stranecki König, C & Wink, 1995 – central Argentina to south Uruguay
 G. b. tucumanum Chapman, 1922 – west Argentina

Trinidad, as well as other localities, have endemic subspecies of the Glaucidium brasilianum owl. Recent genetics work has found substantial differences in ferruginous pygmy owls from different regions and members of the northern ridgwayi group are sometimes considered a separate species, Ridgway's pygmy-owl (Glaucidium ridgwayi).

Description

The ferruginous pygmy owl is small, typically , and stocky with disproportionately large feet and talons. The crown has elongated white/buff streaks, the wing coverts have white spots, and the underparts are heavily streaked white. There are prominent white supercilia above the facial disc. There are two dark spots on the nape, often termed "false eyes" by birders. Otherwise, its overall color is highly variable, ranging from grey-brown with a black-and-white barred tail to rich rufous with a uniform rufous tail. Sexes are similar with females slightly larger and often more reddish. The flight is often undulating in motion, similar to that of many woodpecker species.

Call
The call is a whistled hoo-hoo-hoo-hoo, usually in E flat. It is easily imitated, and is used by birdwatchers to attract small birds intent on mobbing the pygmy owls.

Behavior and ecology
It can be readily located by the small birds that mob it while it is perched in a tree (up to 40 birds of 11 species have been recorded mobbing one owl).

Food and feeding
This species is crepuscular, but often hunts by day. It hunts a variety of birds, lizards, other reptiles, amphibians, mammals, and insects. Specific examples of what these owls feed on include grasshoppers, crickets, scorpions, six-lined racerunners, four-lined skinks, Texas spotted whiptails, creamy-bellied thrushes, pale-breasted thrushes, eared doves, and mice.

Breeding
The breeding season is from late winter to early spring. It is a cavity nesting bird (tree and columnar cactus cavities), laying 1-7 white eggs. Incubation is 28 days, with 27–30 days to fledging.

Status and conservation
The northernmost subspecies, G. b. cactorum, commonly called the cactus ferruginous pygmy owl, was a listed Endangered species under the U.S. Endangered Species Act. It  This protected it in south-central Arizona from loss of habitat and buffel grass fires. Buffel grass catches fire very easily, which spreads to cacti, burning the owl's primary habitat. Its range extends over the border into Sonora, Mexico. G. b. cactorum was delisted in 2006. It was also considered to be an Imperiled Subspecies by NatureServe,  with the species as a whole considered Secure.

References

External links
 Ferruginous Pygmy Owl - Glaucidium brasilianum - USGS Patuxent Bird Identification InfoCenter
 
 Cactus Ferruginous Pygmy Owl information and Photos
 Ferruginous Pygmy Owl Rescue
 Ferruginous Pygmy Owl Photos at peter-haefele.de
 
 
 

ferruginous pygmy owl
Birds of Central America
Birds of Mexico
Owls of South America
Birds of Trinidad and Tobago
Native birds of the Southwestern United States
Fauna of the Sonoran Desert
ferruginous pygmy owl
ferruginous pygmy owl
Birds of the Tepuis